USS Dodger II (SP-46) was an armed motorboat that served as a United States Navy patrol vessel from 1917 to 1919.

Dodger II was built in 1913 as a private motorboat of the same name by the Gas Engine and Power Company at Morris Heights, New York. The U.S. Navy acquired her for World War I service from her owner, Harold I. Pratt of New York City, on 25 May 1917, and commissioned her as patrol boat USS Dodger II (SP-46) on 6 July 1917.

Dodger II was assigned to the 3rd Naval District, where she was assigned patrol duty. She spent her naval career patrolling the New York Harbor area.

Dodger II was stricken from the Navy Directory on 11 March 1919 and sold on 30 April 1919.

References
 
 Department of the Navy: Naval Historical Center: Online Library of Selected Images: U.S. Navy Ships: USS Dodger II (SP-46), 1917–1919. Originally Dodger II (American Motor Pleasure Boat, 1913)
 NavSource Online: Section Patrol Craft Photo Archive Dodger II (SP 46)

External links
 

Patrol vessels of the United States Navy
World War I patrol vessels of the United States
Ships built in Morris Heights, Bronx
1913 ships